Hopeulikit is an unincorporated community in Bulloch County, Georgia, United States.

Toponymy
Pronounced "Hope you like it", the community’s unusual name stems from a 1920s-era dance hall located at the junction of U.S. Route 80 and U.S. Route 25, where the current-day community is located. Hopeulikit has frequently been noted on lists of unusual place names.

History
Hopeulikit was founded by Beatrice and John Paul Ellis of Hopeulikit, whose families have owned land in the area for generations. The state of Georgia has recognized Hopeulikit as a community since its formation in the early 1960s, but the community has remained unincorporated.

Geography
Hopeulikit is located at  (32.5216, -81.8504), approximately eight miles north-west of Statesboro at the intersection of U.S. Highways 25 and 80.  Hopeulikit is 223 feet (68 m) above sea level.

Demographics
Hopeulikit is unincorporated and therefore is not surveyed by the U.S. Census.

Public awareness
When traveling U.S. Route 25 or U.S. Route 80 in Bulloch County, commuters' attention is sure to be drawn to one of the several green road signs saying, "Welcome to Hopeulikit". In the 1920s - 1930s, the area played host to one of the region's largest attractions, "The Hopeulikit Dance Hall". Since the community's formation and adaptation of the unusual name, Georgians have been drawn to the history of this small community, which has caused Hopeulikit to receive attention in the media (WTOC-TV) based out of Savannah and on several tourist attraction themed websites such as: SouthEastRoads, RoadsideThoughts, and The State of Georgia's Communities.

References

Unincorporated communities in Bulloch County, Georgia
Unincorporated communities in Georgia (U.S. state)